Karimnagar is also known as Elagandula (Ancient name) 
is a city and District Headquarters in the Indian state of Telangana. Karimnagar is a major urban agglomeration and fifth largest City in the state. It is governed by Municipal corporation and is the headquarters of the Karimnagar district It is situated on the banks of Manair River, which is a tributary of the Godavari River.It is the third largest and fastest growing urban settlement in the state, according to 2011 census. It has registered a population growth rate of 45.46% and 38.87%  respectively over the past two decades between 1991 and 2011, which is highest growth rate among major cities of Telangana. It serves as a major educational and health hub for the northern districts of Telangana. It is a major business center and widely known for its agricultural and granite industries, earning the nickname "City of Granites."

It has been selected as one of the hundred Indian cities to be developed as a smart city under PM Narendra Modi's flagship Smart Cities Mission by replacing Hyderabad based on the request from the Chief Minister of Telangana K. Chandrashekar Rao.

Etymology 
During the Nizam era, the name Karimnagar was named for a village by an Elgandala Qiladar, Syed Karimuddin.

History

Satavahana dynasty 
Kotilingala now in Jagtial district was the first capital of the Satavahana Kingdom (230 BCE–220 CE). Formerly known as Sabbinadu, inscriptions dating to the Kakatiya dynasty by kings Prola II and Prataparudra found at Karimnagar and Srisailam provide evidence of the area's rich history.

Archaeological excavations in Pedda Bonkur, Dhulikatta and Kotilingalu show that the area was once ruled by the Satvahanas, Mauryas and Asaf Jahis.

Modern era 
It became a district in 1905. It was previously part of princely Hyderabad State and then became part of Hyderabad state in 1948 after the Hyderabad state was annexed into the Indian Union. It then became part of Andhra Pradesh state on 1 November 1956 after merging the Telugu speaking region of Hyderabad state with Andhra state. After almost 6 decades of Telangana statehood movement, on 2 June 2014 it became part of newly formed state of Telangana by Andhra Pradesh Reorganisation Act, 2014.

Demographics 

Karimnagar has a population of 297,447 within its corporation limits, according to 2011 census, making it the fourth largest city in Telangana state. Karimnagar Urban Agglomeration comprising Municipal Corporation and Urban Development authority of 489,985.City out growths include Bommakal (with a population of 9,031), Arepalle (6,987), Alugunur (6,164), Chinthakunta (3,437) and Sitharampur (3,017). Besides these outgrowths, there are many sub-urban areas on the outskirts, which are merged into corporation limits. It is the most densely populated city in Telangana, with a density of 11,114 persons per km2.

Karimnagar city has a literacy rate of 85.82%, which is highest urban literacy rate in Telangana state. Karimnagar urban agglomeration has a literacy rate of 84.93% which is almost equal to the National Urban average of 85%. The literacy rate for males and females for Karimnagar urban region stood at 91.06% and 78.69% respectively.

Climate 

Karimnagar experiences dry inland climatic conditions with hot summers and cool winters. The city of Karimnagar gets most of its rainfall from the Southwest monsoon. The summer season is extremely hot, but temperatures decline with the onset of the monsoons, and the winter season is generally cool. The most popular tourist season is from November to February.

The summer season starts in March and can continue through early June. During this period temperatures range from a minimum of 27 °C to a maximum of 39 °C. The highest recorded temperature in the area is around 48 °C. Nights are much cooler, and the humidity is around 50%. October and November experiences increased rainfall from the Northeast monsoon. During this time, daytime temperatures average around 30 °C. The winter season starts in December and lasts through February. During this time, temperatures range from a minimum of 20 °C to a maximum of 35 °C.

Civic administration 
Karimnagar Municipal Corporation is the civic body that administers the city. It was constituted as a third grade municipality in the year 1952, as a second grade in 1959, first grade in 1984, special grade in 1996, selection grade in 1999 and finally upgraded to corporation in 2005.

Despite of city growing in leaps and bounds, the area of the civic body remaining unaltered. Ever since the municipality was upgraded into corporation in 2005, the merger of adjoining villages on the outskirts with the Corporation was being met with wide opposition from local village authorities.

Sports 

United Karimnagar district has produced many sports persons from the rural level in sports like Karate, Cricket, Kabaddi, Kho-kho and many other sports. Dr.B.R.Ambedkar sports complex is the primary sports complex in the city of Karimnagar. The sports complex has a main stadium used for sports like Athletics, Cricket, Football, an indoor stadium, a hockey field, swimming pool, khokho grounds, basketball courts. Another indoor stadium was built inside SRR college.

Healthcare 

Karimnagar has evolved into a major health centre for its surrounding districts because it is centrally located to all the nearby Districts and Talukas like Jagtial, Siricilla, Ramagundam, Peddapalli, Mancherial, Siddipet, Komaram Bheem, Manthani, Huzurabad, Jammikunta, Husnabad, Sultanabad, Vemulawada, Korutla, Metpalli, Choppadhandi, Manakondur, Bejjanki, Thimmapur, Dharmapuri, Kodimyal, Malyal, Gangadhara and Kalva Srirampur. Patients come from all over the surrounding districts. Karimnagar has two medical institutions Chalmeda Anand Rao Institute of Medical Sciences and Prathima Institute of Medical Sciences. There is also a Cancer hospital in the city. The Newly opened Mother and Child care hospital is next to the Government hospital. Government Civil Hospital is the dominant medical institution.

Tourism 

Lower Manair Dam is one of the biggest dams in the state of Telangana. LMD is the major tourism spot for the people of Karimnagar city. It has boating facilities. Ujwala park and Deer park near LMD are another major part of city's tourism. 

A cable bridge has been under construction on Maner River at Housing Board Colony and Sadashivpalli once completed it will attract tourists. The cable bridge is scheduled to open in 2023 and once opened it will shorten the distance to Warangal by 7 KM. Manair river front development has been proposed by the Chief minister of Telangana after his ministers visited Sabarmati river front in Ahmedabad on Sabarmati river.

Culture 

Telugu is the major language spoken in Karimnagar; Urdu is also widely spoken. The typical attire includes the traditional Chira and Pancha, and also modern dress styles. Karimnagar Silver Filigree is one of the local silverware handicrafts.

Religious worships and festivals 
The spring festival of Bathukamma is typical in this region. Other major Hindu festivals celebrated in the region include Ugadi, Sri Ramanavami, Vinayaka Chavithi, Holi, Sri Krishna Janmashtami, Dasara, Deepavali, Sankranti, and Maha Sivaratri. Muslims in this area also celebrate Eid-ul-Fitr, Eid al-Adha, Ramadan (ninth month of the Islamic calendar), Laylat al-Qadr (Shab-e-Qadr), Isra and Mi'raj (Shab-e-Meraj), Shab-e-barat (Mid-Sha'ban), Milad-un-Nabi (Mawlid) and Muharram (Day of Ashura). These are usually greeted with great pomp and ceremony. Christians in this area celebrate Christmas and Good Friday.

ISKCON Metpally- 
Sri Sri Radha Govardhandhari Temple, Raja Rajeshwara Swamy Temple at Vemulawada,
Narasimha Temple at Dharmapuri, Jagtial district, Anjaneya Temple at Kondagattu, Jagtial District, and Veerabhadra Temple at Kothakonda Jatara are some of the prominent and famous religious destinations.

Cuisine 

Sakinalu a local snack made from rice, gingelly seeds and ajwain during Sankranti festival And Biryani is a common cuisine of the state. Sarvapindi is another traditional snack native to the Telangana state. Kudumulu made with beans and rice flour is another special in Karimnagar.

Economy 

Economy of Karimnagar comes from all three sectors Agriculture, industries, services sectors. There are many granite quarries on the city outskirts near Baopet, and many Agro based industries, Paddy and cotton are the major crop produced in Karimnagar. The Lower Manair Dam in Karimnagar has a capacity of 24.5 tmc which can irrigate 4,00,000 acres of land. 

Under former Information Technology minister of Telangana, KTR has laid the foundation stone for an IT hub for the aim of expanding IT to cities like Karimnagar, Warangal, Nizamabad, Khammam and Mahabubnagar. The IT Tower was completed and inagurated in 2020.  Karimnagar is home for many small scale industries.

Transport 

The city is connected to major cities and towns by means of road. State highways that pass through the city are State highway 1 which is also known as State Highway 1, Telangana Rajeev Rahadari connects with the Hyderabad–Karimnagar–Mancherial Highway coal-belt corridor, State highway 7 and 10, State highway 11 and National highway 563 which connects Jagtial–Karimnagar–Warangal–Khammam.

Airway 

Rajiv Gandhi International Airport in Hyderabad is the nearest airport at a distance of 210 km by road. There are three Helipads in the city inside the district collectorate. The other two nearest airports to Karimnagar are Ramagundam Airport and Warangal Airport which are closed.

Road 
Dr. B. R. Ambedkar Bus Station, in the center of the city is the third biggest bus station in the State of Telangana after Hyderabad and Khammam bus stations.

Railway 
Karimnagar railway station provides rail connectivity to the city, located on the Peddapalli–Nizamabad section of New Delhi–Chennai main line. It is under the jurisdiction of Secunderabad railway division of the South Central Railway zone. Karimnagar is connected to cities like Mumbai with a weekly Super fast express, Hyderabad with Kachiguda passenger daily, Tirupati with a biweekly super fast express and Nizamabad with a DEMU train.

The in-progress Kothapalli-Manoharabad railway line will reduce the travel time from Karimnagar to Hyderabad. As of January 2023, the line is completed until Kodakondla with the remaining work to be completed by 2025.

Media 
The Telugu News publishers in the city are Maithri Channel, Eenadu, Andhra Jyothy. Apart from the local language, there are also English papers such as The Hans India.

Education 

Karimnagar is a major education centre in North-western Telangana. There are many schools and intermediate colleges in the city. Karimnagar has Technology institutes, medical colleges, law colleges.

As part of Telangana state’s long term healthcare industry plan, Karimnagar will operate its own Government Medical College starting with the 2023-2024 batch. 

Universities

 Satavahana University, Karimnagar

Notable people
 G. Ram Reddy
 P.V. Narasimha Rao
 Paidi Jairaj
 Siva Reddy
 N. Kumarayya
 Surendar Reddy
 Midde Ramulu

See also 
List of cities and towns in Telangana
List of districts in Telangana
 Telangana

References

External links 
Karimnagar Municipal Corporation

 
Cities in Telangana
Municipal corporations in Telangana
Mandal headquarters in Karimnagar district
District headquarters of Telangana

te:కరీంనగర్ జిల్లా